Nupserha taliana is a species of beetle in the family Cerambycidae. It was described by Maurice Pic in 1916.

References

taliana
Beetles described in 1916